Desari is a community development block in Vaishali district  in the Indian state of Bihar. The main Post office is Desari  Desari is one of the 16 blocks of Vaishali. There are 39 villages in Desari block.

Desari is about 40 km from Patna and 21 km from Hajipur.

Geography

Villages in Desari 
The Following is a list of all thirty nine villages 
 Desari
 Babhangawan
 Bishunpur Chand
 Bishunpur Ijra
 Chakmahmad
 Chandpura Nankar
 Chandpura Chauck Bhikhanpura
 Chandpur Bazar
 Chak Arab
 Fatikwara
 Dharamdaspur
 Dharampur Ram Rae
 Ganiari
 Ghazipur Garahi
 Jafrabad
 Jaga Chandpura
 Jahangirpur Sham
 Kharkpur Urf Saifabad
 Khoksa Buzurg

 Khairi rampur
 Kuatpur
 Lakhanpur Tal
 Lakhanpura
 Madhaul Harpur Chand
 Madhaul Khurd
 Madhopur Gajpati
 Mamrezpur
 Mohammadpur BuzurgUrfLakhanpur
 Panapur Raghunath
 Azampur
 Rampur Kichni
 Rampur Madhaul
 Rasulpur Habib
 Rasulpur Jilani
 Sauta
 Tayabpur
 Tayabpur Kharij Jama
 Uphraul

Education 
 Middle school Fatikwara 
 BPS College
 SPS college 
 RR College
 Desari High School
 Chakmahmad Middle School
 High School Bhatauliya, Chandpura Nankhar
 St Michael School, Desari
 Boys Middle School, Desari
 Girls Middle School, Desari
 The IAS Ville, Desari Lakhanpur
 Middle school, Khoksa Kalyan
 St. Joseph public school, Desari
S.d Public school, desari
Middle school JAFRABAD

Economy
Mango, lychee, betel leaf and bananas are the main trees grown in the area for horticulture. Major Indian Banks such as State Bank of India, Bank of India, Central Bank of India, Corporation Bank, Bandhan Bank and Bank of Baroda have branches here catering to the financial needs of the local population.

Developing Desari 

 
Desari Block Headquarters is situated at Desari along with police station. 
.Moreover, Desari Railway station connects Baurani junction  in East and Hajipur in West. In last few years, People have started to consume fast food, chicken, milk etc a lot showing prosperity in nearby areas , there has been recent developments by present mukhiya Asha Kumari  through various development process.

Culture
Languages spoken by the people are Bajjika and Hindi.

Festivals
Holi, Durga Puja, Deepawali and Chhath Puja are the prime festivals. People also celebrate Rakshabandhan, Janmashtmi, Shivratri, Makar Sankranti, Saraswati Puja, Republic Day, Independence Day and other local festivals.

References
Popular Places

Baba Dinneshawar Nath Madir, Vishhar Sthan, Kali Asthan Near Desari high School.

Community development blocks in Vaishali district